William Falkner may refer to: 

 William Faulkner (born William Cuthbert Falkner, 1897–1962), American author
 William Falkner (divine) (died 1682), English cleric with the Anglican Church
 William Clark Falkner ( 1826–1889), American soldier, businessman, author and the great-grandfather of William Faulkner
 Bill Falkner, member of the Missouri House of Representatives

See also
 William Faulkner (disambiguation)
 William Falconer (disambiguation)
 Falkner (disambiguation)